Johnny Hammond may refer to:

Johnny "Hammond" Smith (1933–1997), American soul and jazz organist
Johnny Hammond (rugby union) (1860–1907), English rugby union player

See also
John Hammond (disambiguation)